Reinhold Bocklet (born April 5, 1943 in Schongau) is a German politician, representative of the Christian Social Union of Bavaria.

He has been Vice President of the Landtag of Bavaria since 2009.

See also
List of Bavarian Christian Social Union politicians

References

External links
 Documents on the Bocklet Report are at the Historical Archives of EU in Florence.

Ministers of the Bavaria State Government
Christian Social Union in Bavaria politicians
1943 births
Living people
Recipients of the Cross of the Order of Merit of the Federal Republic of Germany
People from Weilheim-Schongau